Fallypride is a high affinity dopamine D2/D3 receptor antagonist used in medical research, usually in the form of fallypride (18F) as a positron emission tomography (PET) radiotracer in human studies.

References

External links 
ChemSpider

Typical antipsychotics
Benzamides
Pyrrolidines
Phenol ethers
D2 antagonists

Radiopharmaceuticals
Allylamines